John Donovan Maia, more commonly known as Johnny Hooker (Recife, 6 August 1987), is a Brazilian singer-songwriter, actor and screenwriter. He won the Prêmio da Música Brasileira for Best Singer in the Pop Music category.

His music has been featured in soundtracks such as "Volta" (featured in Tatuagem), "Amor Marginal" (featured in Babilônia) and "Alma Sebosa" (featured in Geração Brasil, in which he also played the role of Thales Salgado).

His debut album, Eu Vou Fazer uma Macumba pra Te Amarrar, Maldito! topped Deezer and the MPB iTunes Brasil chart.

Early life 
John Donovan Maia was born in Recife, Pernambuco, on 6 August 1987. His grandfather was Irish.

Career 
In 2011, he was nominated for Best New Artists at the Prêmio Multishow de Música Brasileira.

In 2009, he made his acting debut on the short film Não me Deixe em Casa, directed by Daniel Aragão, and in 2013 he performed for the soundtrack of the movie Tatuagem, by Hilton Lacerda, in which the singer guest appears to perform the film theme.

In 2014, Hooker was cast as musician Thales Salgado in the Rede Globo telenovela Geração Brasil. One of his songs also appeared among the soundtrack: "Alma Sebosa", theme from the character Barata (Leandro Hassum).

The song later received a video on 27 September 2014. It won an award at the 16th Festcine, in Recife, and was included in many year-end best clips lists. In December 2014, TV presenter and journalist Zeca Camargo praised the song in his personal blog:

In the first semester of 2015, Hooker made his directional debu with the short film Classic, which he also wrote.

"Amor Marginal", from his debut album Eu Vou Fazer Uma Macumba pra te Amarrar, Maldito! was picked for the telenovela Babilônia's soundtrack in 2015.

Eu Vou Fazer uma Macumba pra Te Amarrar, Maldito! was released on 22 February 2015, topping Deezer and reaching #14 on iTunes.

Johnny won the 26th Prêmio da Música Brasileira for Best Singer for the album. During the award ceremony, on 10 June 2015, Johnny sang "Lama" with Alcione as a tribute to Maria Bethânia, gaining press attention.

Fafá de Belém covered the song "Volta", written by Hooker, on her then new album Do Tamanho Certo para meu Sorriso in 2015.

On 20 September 2015, he released a video for "Amor Marginal". The song reached the Brazilian trending topics and the video was viewed over 130,000 times in its first week.

Filmography 
 2009 – Não Me Deixe em Casa (short film) de Daniel Aragão – as Carlos
 2011 – A Febre do Rato, by Claudio Assis – as amigo do Zizo
 2013 – A Menina Sem Qualidades, by Felipe Hirsh – as Amigo do Toni
 2013 – Tatuagem, by Hilton Lacerda – as Johnny Hooker
 2014 – Geração Brasil, by Denise Saraceni (novela) – as Thales Moreira
 2016 – O Ateliê da Rua do Brum, by Juliano Dornelles – as Osíris (post-production)
 2016 – Saudade, by Paulo Caldas (documentário) – entrevistado (post-production)
 2017 – Berenice Procura, by Allan Fitterman – as Johnny Hooker (filming)

Discography

Studio albums 
 2015 – Eu Vou Fazer uma Macumba pra Te Amarrar, Maldito!
 2017 – Coração

As Johnny and The Hookers 
 2012 – Roquestar

Live albums 
 2021 – Macumba – Ao Vivo em Recife

EPs 
 2004 – The Blink of the Whore's Pussy
 2007 – Ultra Violence Discotheque
 2008 – Fire!

Awards and nominations 

 2004 – Festival Microfonia (nominated)
 2004 – Best New Artist at RecifeRock! (nominated)
 2006 – Festival Microfonia (nominated)
 2008 – Festival Microfonia (winner)
 2010 – selected for the Edital Nacional Conexão Vivo
 2010 – International Songwriting Competition – Dance category (nominated)
 2010 – Best Show of the Year – Troféu Sonar PE (winner)
 2010 – Programa Geleia do Rock – Multishow (winner)
 2011 – Prêmio Multishow de Música Brasileira – best New Artist (nominated)
 2013 – Video Category – Festcine PE – (second place)
 2013 – Prêmio Anfitrião 2013 – Best Original Song award for "Volta" (off Tatuagems soundtrack
 2014 – Video category – Festcine PE – winner
 2015 – Best Singer award – Pop Music category – 26º Prêmio da Música Brasileira
 2015 – UOL Música Year-End Best New Artist (nominated)
 2015 – Song of the Year for "Eu Vou Fazer Uma Macumba pra Te Amarrar, Maldito!" – second place – Popular Vote – Rolling Stone Brasil
 2015 – Album of the Year for Eu Vou Fazer Uma Macumba pra Te Amarrar, Maldito! – third place – Popular Vote – Rolling Stone Brasil
 2015 – Song of the Year for "Eu Vou Fazer Uma Macumba pra Te Amarrar, Maldito!" – winner – Official Judges – Rolling Stone Brasil
 2015 – Album of the Year for Eu Vou Fazer Uma Macumba pra Te Amarrar, Maldito! – winner – Official Judges – Rolling Stone Brasil

References

External links 
 

Brazilian people of Irish descent
1987 births
Living people
Male actors from Recife
People from Recife
Brazilian male screenwriters
Brazilian male songwriters
Brazilian LGBT singers
Brazilian LGBT songwriters
Brazilian male singer-songwriters
Brazilian rock singers
Brazilian LGBT screenwriters
Brazilian LGBT actors
LGBT people in Latin music